Carolina Paola Venegas Morales (born 28 September 1991) is a Costa Rican footballer who plays as a forward for Mexican Liga MX Femenil club Atlas FC and the Costa Rica women's national team. In 2015–16, she played for the Spanish club Madrid CFF.

Personal life
Carolina's sister Adriana also played as a forward in the Costa Rican team at the 2015 FIFA Women's World Cup.

Honours 
Costa Rica
Winner
 Central American Games: 2013
Campeona en Portugal con el Sporting en 2017

References

External links
 
 Carolina Venegas at Fedefutbol 
 
 
 
 

1991 births
Living people
Footballers from San José, Costa Rica
Costa Rican women's footballers
Women's association football forwards
Deportivo Saprissa players
Madrid CFF players
Sporting CP (women's football) players
Atlas F.C. (women) footballers
United Women's Soccer players
Campeonato Nacional de Futebol Feminino players
Liga MX Femenil players
Costa Rica women's international footballers
Footballers at the 2011 Pan American Games
Pan American Games competitors for Costa Rica
Central American Games medalists in football
Central American Games gold medalists for Costa Rica
2015 FIFA Women's World Cup players
Footballers at the 2015 Pan American Games
Costa Rican expatriate footballers
Costa Rican expatriate sportspeople in Spain
Expatriate women's footballers in Spain
Costa Rican expatriate sportspeople in the United States
Expatriate women's soccer players in the United States
Costa Rican expatriate sportspeople in Portugal
Expatriate women's footballers in Portugal
Costa Rican expatriate sportspeople in Mexico
Expatriate women's footballers in Mexico